The 48th Tour of Flanders cycling classic was held on Sunday, 5 April 1964. The race was won by West German rider Rudi Altig after a 60 km solo breakaway. At four minutes, Benoni Beheyt won the sprint for second place before Jo de Roo. 51 of 119 riders finished.

Route
The race started in Ghent and finished in Gentbrugge – covering 240 km. There were six categorized climbs:

Results

References

External links
 Video of the 1964 Tour of Flanders  on Sporza (in Dutch)

Tour of Flanders
1964 in road cycling
1964 in Belgian sport
1964 Super Prestige Pernod